Richard Neece Ojeda II (born October 25, 1970) is an American politician and retired United States Army major who served in the West Virginia Senate representing the 7th district from 2016 until 2019. A member of the Democratic Party, he ran a brief campaign for President of the United States in the 2020 election.

Raised in Logan, West Virginia, Ojeda graduated from West Virginia State University and Webster University. He initially joined the United States Army as an enlisted soldier and went through officer training after finishing college. During his 25 years in the military, Ojeda earned two Bronze Star Medals and rose to the rank of major. After retiring, he initially worked as a Junior Reserve Officers' Training Corps teacher before running for office.

Ojeda was elected to the West Virginia Senate in 2016. He received national attention when he became a vocal supporter of the 2018 teachers' strike and advocated for the legalization of cannabis in West Virginia. In November 2018, Ojeda announced his candidacy for president in the 2020 election, but he dropped out in January 2019 when his campaign failed to gain traction. In January 2020, Ojeda announced he would instead challenge incumbent Senator Shelley Moore Capito in the 2020 election, but he failed to secure the Democratic nomination in the primary.

Early life and education
Ojeda was born in Rochester, Minnesota, the son of Florena (Pansera) and Richard N. Ojeda. He was born into a Democratic family and he registered as a Democrat. He remarked that "back when I was in high school, being a Republican was like cursing". Ojeda's paternal grandfather, Senon H. Ojeda, was an illegal immigrant from the Mexican state of Jalisco who came to West Virginia during the coal boom to try and make a living, and later gained citizenship. One of Ojeda's grandparents died in a mining accident after fighting in World War II. Ojeda's father was born in the United States, but moved to Mexico and lived there until the age of eight. Ojeda's father worked as a nurse anaesthetist. Ojeda also has Italian ancestry.

Ojeda graduated from Logan High School in 1988. He earned a bachelor's degree in General Education from West Virginia State University and a master's degree in Business and Organizational Security from Webster University.

Military service and teaching career

Ojeda said "Where I come from, when you graduate high school, there’s only three choices—dig coal, sell dope, or join the Army. And I chose the military". He served 25 years in the United States Army, starting as an enlisted soldier before going through officer training and rising to the rank of major. He earned two Bronze Stars. During his service, he spent time in South Korea, Honduras, Jordan, Haiti, Afghanistan, and Iraq, where he was attached to the 20th Engineer Brigade.

After retiring from the military, Ojeda worked as a Junior ROTC instructor at Chapmanville Regional High School from 2013 to 2017, resigning due to time constraints related to his service as State Senator, in addition with his run for Congress. He helped start a Junior Reserve Officers' Training Corps at a local high school. He established a social services nonprofit, the Logan Empowerment Action and Development, which engaged in community cleanup, Christmas toy drives, providing meals for the needy, and raising money for shoes for kids. During this time, Ojeda also started penning letters to the editor of the Logan Banner. As a result, Ojeda was invited by Senator Joe Manchin of West Virginia to the 2013 State of the Union as a guest. Ojeda decided to enter politics while listening to Manchin discuss disparities in allocation of "manufacturing hubs" to different regions of West Virginia.

Political career
Ojeda entered politics in 2014, running for Congress in West Virginia's 3rd District. He garnered 34% of the vote in the Democratic primary, losing to incumbent Nick Rahall, whom Ojeda challenged on the grounds that the incumbent was not doing enough to advance the interests of the district.

West Virginia Senate
Ojeda was assaulted at a primary campaign event on May 8, 2016, in Logan County, West Virginia. The assailant, Jonathan S. Porter, who had ties to Ojeda's opponent, received 1–5 years in prison, and a $500 fine as a part of a plea deal. Ojeda went on to win the Democratic Primary for the 7th District of the West Virginia Senate, defeating incumbent Art Kirkendoll. In the general election, held on November 8, 2016, he defeated Republican Jordan Bridges by almost 18 points.

In the West Virginia Senate, Ojeda sponsored the West Virginia Medical Cannabis Act, legislation to legalize medical marijuana, which was signed into law by Governor Jim Justice on April 19, 2017.

In the Senate, he called for increases in teacher wages, arguing that low pay would lead to strikes and teachers leaving the state. In January 2018, he criticized West Virginia Governor Jim Justice's proposed 1–2% increase in teacher wages, saying it was insufficient.

Ojeda has stated "I don't think I've ever voted for a Democrat for president" and supported Donald Trump in 2016. He told Politico that he voted for Trump because he initially believed Trump would do something for West Virginians. By 2018, he expressed regret for voting for Trump, saying that "he hasn't done shit" and he is "taking care of the daggone people he's supposed to be getting rid of". Ojeda said he supported Bernie Sanders in the 2016 Democratic primary.

Ojeda resigned from the West Virginia Senate on January 14, 2019, citing frustration with the legislature's slow pace and his inability to accomplish all his legislative goals.

Teacher strikes 
Ojeda rose to prominence for his early support of and leading role in the West Virginia teacher strikes. A month before the strike, Ojeda, in a speech on the Senate floor, called on his fellow legislators to heed the complaints and requests of teachers lest a strike be inevitable. He then introduced several bills, including ones addressing public employees' healthcare needs, raising their wages, and giving teachers tax deductions on purchased classroom supplies. Due to his active and vocal support of the strikes, Ojeda was said by some to have attained something of a "folk hero" status with teachers and other unionists. He was regularly met by chants of his last name and other expressions of appreciation and commendation while traveling the state to speak out in support of the strikers (and later his Congressional bid).

Ojeda traveled to California to support the 2019 Los Angeles teachers' strike, proclaiming "Don’t make us go West Virginia on you" in an op-ed published in The Intercept.

2018 U.S. House campaign

Ojeda ran for West Virginia's 3rd congressional district, a seat which was vacated by Republican Evan Jenkins, who filed instead to run in the primary for the U.S. Senate. His campaign was staffed in part by local residents who were working on the campaign without pay, and held private jobs while working on the campaign.

According to Ojeda, his campaign only accepted donations from individual donors and labor unions. He won the Democratic primary on May 9, 2018, defeating Shirley Love, Janice Hagerman, and Paul Davis.

The web publication Salon.com said that Ojeda's race was a potential bellwether due to the perceived alienation of a significant part of the electorate that supported Trump's candidacy, noting that "Ojeda is no stranger to converting Trump supporters: He won his state Senate election by 18 points, in a district Trump carried by 59."

During the campaign, Ojeda agreed to an interview for Michael Moore's documentary, Fahrenheit 11/9. Ojeda's off the cuff unpolished pronouncements subsequently appeared in the trailer for the movie; "I’m sick and tired of people telling me America is the greatest country—because we can whip your ass?", and "I don’t give a shit who you are. I’ll fight you in the damn street right now". The comments were used by opponent Carol Miller's campaign to bring under question Ojeda's patriotism while labeling him as unhinged. Ojeda took issue with Miller's criticism in a campaign ad. Ojeda also made an appearance on The Young Turks interview show Rebel HQ, where he discussed his economic policies.

As the polling began to indicate a tight race, President Trump traveled to West Virginia in October to campaign for Miller. On the stump, Trump mocked Ojeda while making a point of pronouncing Ojeda's last name while affecting an Hispanic accent.

On November 6, 2018, Ojeda was defeated in the general election by 12 points, winning 44% of the vote to Miller's 56%. For Democrats, this was a 32-point improvement in performance from the previous election, where the Democrat won only 24% to the Republican's 68%. According to FiveThirtyEight, Ojeda outperformed his district's partisan lean by 25%, the strongest showing for a non-incumbent.

2020 presidential campaign

In November 2018, Ojeda filed with the Federal Election Commission, officially becoming a candidate for President of the United States. His campaign was announced on November 11, at a rally in Louisville, Kentucky, which consisted mostly of union members. His campaign focuses included ending government corruption and returning the Democratic Party to a party that benefited the working class. As no incumbent state legislator has ever mounted a serious bid for the presidency, Ojeda was considered a "longshot" and "underdog" candidate.

He resigned from the West Virginia Senate on January 9, 2019, to focus on his presidential bid. A few days after, Ojeda asked the Senate Minority Leader (a Democrat) if he could rescind his resignation, with the Senate Minority Leader telling Ojeda to talk to the Senate President (a Republican) because that is to whom he sent the resignation letter. The Republican Governor, Jim Justice, seated a lobbyist in Ojeda's vacant seat.

Ojeda dropped out of the race on January 26, 2019, citing his inability to get face time with the networks, and stating one must have access to wealth and power to run for office. He broadcast his withdrawal in an hour-long Facebook live feed.

Endorsements

2020 Senate campaign

On January 13, 2020, Ojeda announced his campaign for the United States Senate, hoping to challenge incumbent Shelley Moore Capito. On June 9, 2020, Ojeda was defeated in the primary election by five points, winning 33% of the vote, as opposed to Paula Jean Swearengin's 38%.  On the night of the primary, Ojeda publicly conceded the election to Swearengin in a post shared from his campaign's official Facebook page, while hinting that his time in politics is not yet over.  At the time of his concession, Ojeda also endorsed Swearengin as the Democratic Party's nominee in the general election.

Political positions

Ideological orientation
Ojeda has been described by some as a populist of the "left-wing variety", and a "staunch progressive". He identifies as a traditional working-class Democrat and laments what he perceives as a Democratic party that is increasingly drifting away from its working-class roots and becoming a party of the elite. In the 2016 Democratic presidential primary, he says he voted for Independent Senator Bernie Sanders. He has also been described as a moderate Democrat and he stated that he voted for President Donald Trump in the 2016 presidential election (a decision he later regretted). He describes himself as a "conservative on most cultural issues" who supports coal jobs and border security.

Taxes 
Ojeda was one of the few West Virginia lawmakers who came out outspokenly in favor of raising taxes on corporations and the rich, calling for higher corporate taxes (particularly on coal and gas corporations that were the major economic players in WV) to offset spending cuts that had negatively affected public services and employees in the state.

Labor rights 
Ojeda is devoutly pro-union and has received $121,440 from several unions, including the American Federation of Teachers and the Teamsters' Union. Ojeda opposes right-to-work laws.

Gun control
On gun control, Ojeda has been described as pro-gun, and has stated he agreed with Carol Miller's position that increased services for the mentally-ill would help ease gun violence, his own stances on guns have also been described as similar to Miller's overall, such as mass shootings, and in doing so he would launch a campaign to help remove stigmas regarding mentally-ill individuals. He has also stated that he supports the second amendment, and does not believe more restrictions are needed.

However, on August 8, 2019, following the Dayton and El Paso shootings, Ojeda called pro-gun rights politicians "spineless pieces of shit" who "didn't have the balls" to take on the NRA. He also called for heavier gun restrictions, citing recent mass shootings which accounted for a total of 74 deaths.

Foreign policy
Ojeda, on his Twitter account has posted several tweets opposed to Saudi Arabia and the intervention it leads in support of the Yemeni government against the Iranian-backed Houthis that had taken over much of Yemen's north including its capital, Sanaa, he stated that the US should end support for Saudi Arabia and end arms deals with the nation, he also condemned the country for the alleged involvement of the Saudi government in Jamal Khashoggi's death.

Regarding Iran, Ojeda has stated he would not support a war with Iran.

Abortion
Ojeda self-identifies as pro choice. He supports abortion rights and that he would only nominate judges who likewise shared his support for access to abortion. In 2018, he said regarding the term pro-life, which is used to describe those who are against abortions as, "I’m also calling bullshit on the idea that opposing abortion makes you pro-life...If you just want to keep working class women from making their own decisions, you might be pro-birth but you’re not pro-life." He has also voiced opposition to the Helms Amendment that limits the United States in assistance to abortion through foreign aid, saying, "a woman raped by the Taliban or Boko Haram should not be forced by the callousness of our government to bear her rapist’s child".

In 2016, Ojeda described himself as "pro-life, with exceptions".

“I’ve always said that I’m pro-life,” he told WCHS during the campaign, “but I also, being someone who almost lost my wife and child during child birth, I think it’s also important in certain circumstances that the mother have the ability to choose her life.”

Healthcare 
Ojeda supports Medicare for All. He has also stated that Congress and the president should be barred from taking out extra insurance, and would instead have to rely on the standard healthcare which would be afforded every American citizen for the course of their terms to incentivize them in promoting and maintaining quality comprehensive universal healthcare coverage.

Environment 
Ojeda has called for sustainable energy. He is in favor of a Green New Deal.

Ojeda has noted that he sees a limited role of the anthracite coal (like the one mined in his home state) in steel-making for the foreseeable future but has acknowledged that coal is "not gonna come back", and expressed his desire to find a way for miners to transition into other well-paying jobs.

During his 2018 congressional campaign, Ojeda praised the Trump administration's plan to roll back environmental regulations of the Obama administration and stated it would benefit the coal industry.

"President Trump made a promise to West Virginia to help put our coal miners back to work and in many places our coal miners are working again," Ojeda said in a statement "This will help West Virginia. This will help coal mining families. The fact is that President Trump's EPA's proposal will help put more West Virginians to work in the third congressional district."

Immigration 
Ojeda supports Deferred Action for Childhood Arrivals and a pathway to citizenship for "Dreamers".

In his reasoning for voting for Trump in 2016, Ojeda cited Trump's stance on reducing immigration and limiting the admission of refugees as reasons for his support.

“When you hear about illegal aliens getting benefits and you have people here starving to death and can’t get nothing, it’s just a slap in the face,” Ojeda said in a New Yorker interview. “When you start talking about bringing in refugees and when they get here they get medical and dental and they get set up with some funds—what do we get? So when people hear Donald Trump saying we’re going to take benefits away from people who come here illegally and give them to people who work, that sounds pretty good.”

Cannabis 
Ojeda has called for the legalization of marijuana and clemency for those incarcerated for possession. During his tenure as State Senator, Ojeda spearheaded the passage of a bill legalizing medical marijuana. He advocates directing funds raised from taxes on cannabis sales to fund public works.

Pharmaceutical companies 
Ojeda has taken stances against the pharmaceutical industry, focusing in particular on its role in sparking the opioid epidemic.

Campaign finance, political ethics, and transparency 
As described by Ojeda, his campaign focused on "lobbying and corruption in Washington", and has proposed measures to address political ethics. Ojeda has proposed requiring body-cams on lobbyists in order to increase government transparency and public oversight. He is a supporter of WolfPAC, and has pledged not to take corporate donations for his campaign.

Ojeda has proposed that federally elected officials and Cabinet officials must donate to charity any net worth exceeding one million dollars to prevent exploitation of political office for personal financial gain. He proposed that, upon retirement from public office, such officials must be subject to an annual earnings limit of $120,000 (in addition to a $130,000 pension), "subject to automatic yearly cost of living adjustments."

Ojeda has called for implementing "donor vouchers," allocated funds that would give individual voters small amounts of money to donate to the candidate of their choice, to enhance the financial sway of individual, poorer voters.

Electoral history

References

External links
 
 
 Fahrenheit 11/9 partial Ojeda interview

1970 births
20th-century American military personnel
21st-century American politicians
United States Army personnel of the Iraq War
United States Army personnel of the War in Afghanistan (2001–2021)
American people of Italian descent
American politicians of Mexican descent
Candidates in the 2018 United States elections
Candidates in the 2020 United States presidential election
Candidates in the 2020 United States Senate elections
Hispanic and Latino American military personnel
Living people
Military personnel from Minnesota
Military personnel from West Virginia
Minnesota Democrats
People from Logan County, West Virginia
Politicians from Rochester, Minnesota
Populism in the United States
United States Army officers
Webster University alumni
West Virginia Democrats
West Virginia state senators
West Virginia State University alumni